Figgs may refer to:

 Figgs, Kentucky, unincorporated community within Shelby County
 The Figgs, American rock band

People with the name Figgs
 George Figgs (born 1947), American actor and projectionist
 Ukari Figgs (born 1977), American basketball player

See also
 Figg, surname
 Fig (disambiguation)